The 1923 North Carolina State Wolfpack football team was an American football team that represented North Carolina State University during the 1923 college football season. In its fourth season under head coach Harry Hartsell, the team compiled a 3–7 record.

Schedule

References

NC State
NC State Wolfpack football seasons
NC State Wolfpack football